Rail Enthusiast may refer to:

Railfan
Rail (magazine); English magazine originally named Rail Enthusiast